Kerplunk (stylized as Kerplunk!)  is the second studio album by American rock band Green Day, released on December 17, 1991, by Lookout! Records. Kerplunk was Green Day's last independent release on the Lookout Records label, and was also the first album to feature Tré Cool on drums. Kerplunk officially includes only 12 tracks, but the versions released on CD and cassette also include the 4 tracks from the Sweet Children EP. One of those tracks is a cover of The Who's "My Generation". Green Day guitarist and singer Billie Joe Armstrong stated in a 2021 Vulture magazine interview that Kerplunk is his favorite album, citing it as "kind of autobiographical."

Music
Kerplunk's sound has been described as punk rock, pop punk, and indie rock.

Artwork 
Kerplunk was banned from certain stores because of the cover art. The cover features a mostly white picture (with some green added in) of a girl with a gun that has been fired. On the back cover, there is a boy lying on the ground with a gunshot wound on his back.

Release 
The album sold 10,000 copies its first day and became Lookout!'s biggest-selling release. After debuting it to their fans in the Berkeley, California, area and receiving much approval from the critical 924 Gilman Street crowd, the band packed up in a cramped, converted Bookmobile and headed east. Green Day developed a fan base on the east coast by way of the determined grassroots efforts of lead singer Billie Joe Armstrong. The opportunity paid off, as album sales reached over 50,000 copies. Along with the successful live shows, major labels took notice of Kerplunks phenomenal popularity. As a result, many labels approached the band.  Green Day realized that they had outgrown their record distribution capacity with Lookout! and eventually signed with Reprise Records. With Reprise, Green Day recorded and released their next album Dookie (1994).

In August 2005, Green Day pulled the album – as well as all of their other material released through the Lookout! label – due to unpaid royalties. It was reissued on CD by Reprise Records, who Green Day has been with since leaving Lookout!, on January 9, 2007. In Europe, the album was released by Epitaph Europe, and has remained in print. It was reissued on vinyl on March 24, 2009, by Reprise Records. There were no official singles released from the album, although "2000 Light Years Away" and "Christie Road" were released as mock-up singles in a Green Day singles box set entitled Green Day: Ultimate Collectors. In November 2017, to coincide with the band's second compilation Greatest Hits: God's Favorite Band, a music video was released for "2000 Light Years Away". As of November 2013, Kerplunk has sold more than 1,000,000 copies in the United States and more than 4,000,000 copies worldwide.

 Reception 

AllMusic regards Kerplunk as the "perfect dry run" for the band's later mainstream appeal, saying it contains "both more variety and more flat-out smashes than previous releases had shown." Pitchfork Media states "All in all, it's a magnitude better than its predecessor and only a hair behind the follow up."

In December 2007, Blender magazine ranked the album number 47 on their "The 100 Greatest Indie Rock Albums Ever" list.

 Track listing 

 Personnel 
Adapted from the album liner notes.Green Day Billie Joe Armstrong – lead vocals, guitar, drums and backing vocals on "Dominated Love Slave"
 Mike Dirnt – bass, backing vocals
 Tré Cool – drums, lead vocals and guitar on "Dominated Love Slave"
 Al Sobrante – drums on bonus tracks "Sweet Children", "Best Thing in Town", "Strangeland" and "My Generation"Production'
 Andy Ernst – producer, engineer, mixer
 Green Day – producers
 John Kiffmeyer – executive producer
 John Golden – mastering
 Chris Applecore – cover art, disc
 Pat Hynes – artwork
 Thadicus – art direction

Certifications

References

External links 

Kerplunk at YouTube (streamed copy where licensed)

1991 albums
Green Day albums
Lookout! Records albums
Albums produced by Andy Ernst